Cychrus schneideri is a species of ground beetle in the subfamily of Carabinae. It was described by Imura in 1997.

References

schneideri
Beetles described in 1997